Area codes 540 and 826 are telephone area codes in the North American Numbering Plan (NANP) for the north-western region of the U.S. State of Virginia, including the Shenandoah Valley, the Roanoke metropolitan area, the northern and eastern parts in Virginia of the New River Valley, and the outermost parts of the Washington metropolitan area. The Virginia State Corporation Commission authorized the addition of 826 to the numbering plan area for implementation in May 2022.

History
Area code 540 was established on July 15, 1995, when numbering plan area 703 was divided. Arlington County, Alexandria, Fairfax County, Fairfax City, Falls Church, Prince William County, Manassas, Manassas Park, Eastern Loudoun County, Northern Stafford County, and a very small portion of Fauqier County remained in area code 703, while the rest of the area was reassigned to area code 540.

Due to the continued growth of telecommunication services in the area, it was necessary to split 540 as well. On September 1, 2001, the farthest western region of Virginia was established as a separate numbering plan area with area code 276.

The pool of central office codes for the area code was projected to exhaust in 2022. For relief, the Virginia State Corporation Commission approved a plan in June 2020 to add area code 826 to form an all-services overlay. Implementation of the overlay was projected to be on May 14, 2022 and was implemented as proposed on that date. This made ten-digit dialing mandatory in the overlay area, with recorded messages passed on to callers dialling the old method.

Service area
The numbering plan area includes the communities of
Bedford,
Berryville,
Blacksburg, 
Buchanan, 
Buena Vista, 
Cave Spring,
Clifton Forge,
Covington,
Fincastle,
Floyd,
Fredericksburg,
Front Royal,
Greenville, 
Harrisonburg, 
Hot Springs,
Lexington,
Louisa,
Luray,
Madison,
Mineral,
Orange,
Pulaski,
Radford,
Roanoke, 
Rocky Mount,
Salem, 
Staunton,
Warrenton, 
Little Washington,
Waynesboro, and
Winchester.

It serves the counties of
Alleghany,
Augusta,
Bath,
Botetourt,
Clarke, 
Craig,
Culpeper, 
Fauquier, 
Floyd,
Franklin,
Frederick,
Giles,
Highland,
King George,
Louisa,
Madison,
Montgomery,
Orange,
Page,
Pulaski,
Rappahannock,
Roanoke, 
Rockingham,
Rockbridge,  
Shenandoah, 
Spotsylvania,
Stafford, and
Warren, as well as portions of Bedford County, and a small portion of Albemarle County consisting of Afton and Greenwood that is in a LATA served by Verizon landline service rather than CenturyLink.
It also partially serves western Loudoun County, whereas most of the county is in the numbering plan area 703/571.

References

External links

 List of exchanges from AreaCodeDownload.com, 540 Area Code

540
540